The men's single sculls rowing event at the 2013 Mediterranean Games will be held from June 21–23 at the Seyhan Dam in Adana.

Schedule
All times are Eastern European Summer Time (UTC+3).

Results

Heat 1

Heat 2

Repechage

Final B

Final A

References

Rowing at the 2013 Mediterranean Games